1031, a Number of Things From... is a 1998 demo-compilation released by Detroit heavy metal band Halloween to help raise money to keep the band going after a reunion with original members Rick Craig and Bill Whyte. The compilation includes five tracks from the 1990 release Vicious Demos and a number of unreleased tracks recorded through the years with different lineups.

Track listing 
 I Confess
 Vicious Lies
 Evil Nation
 Agony
 Black Skies
 11
 Sudden Death
 Intoxicated
 In Darkness
 Crying for You
 1-900
 1989
 The Battle
 I Scream

Sources 
Official website
Halloween at Encyclopaedia Metallum

Halloween (band) albums
1998 albums